The 1869 South Derbyshire by-election was fought on 16 January 1869.  The by-election was fought due to the death of the incumbent MP of the Conservative Party, Sir Thomas Gresley.  It was won by the Conservative candidate Henry Wilmot.

References

1869 elections in the United Kingdom
1869 in England
19th century in Derbyshire
By-elections to the Parliament of the United Kingdom in Derbyshire constituencies
January 1869 events